HD 37017 is a binary star system in the equatorial constellation of Orion. It has the variable star designation V1046 Orionis; HD 37017 is the identifier from the Henry Draper Catalogue. The system is a challenge to view with the naked eye, being close to the lower limit of visibility with a combined apparent visual magnitude of 6.55. It is located at a distance of approximately 1,230 light years based on parallax, and is drifting further away with a radial velocity of +32 km/s. The system is part of star cluster NGC 1981.

The binary nature of this system was suggested by A. Blaauw and T. S. van Albada in 1963. It is a double-lined spectroscopic binary with an orbital period of 18.6556 days and an eccentricity of 0.31. The eccentricity is considered unusually large for such a close system. It forms a suspected eclipsing binary that ranges in brightness from 6.54 down to 6.58.

The primary is a helium-strong, magnetic chemically peculiar star with a stellar classification of B1.5 Vp. V1046 Orionis was found to be a variable star by L. A. Balona in 1997, and is now classified as an SX Arietis variable. The star undergoes periodic changes in visual brightness, magnetic field strength, and spectral characteristics with a cycle time of 0.901175 days – the star's presumed rotation period. Radio emission has been detected that varies with the rotation period.

The secondary component has an estimated 4.5 times the mass of the Sun. The class has been estimated as type B6III-IV.

References

External links
 Simbad

B-type main-sequence stars
Ap stars
SX Arietis variables
Eclipsing binaries
Spectroscopic binaries

Orion (constellation)
Durchmusterung objects
037017
1890
026233
Orionis, V1046